Zach Appelman (born August 5, 1985) is an American film, television and theatre actor. He is known for portraying Luke Detweiler in the 2013 film Kill Your Darlings, Joe Corbin in the television series Sleepy Hollow, and Alton Finn in the television series Beauty & the Beast.

Early life
Appelman was born and raised in Palo Alto, California, and attended high school there. Appelman played many sports in high school, including track and field, wrestling, and competitive martial arts. Appelman earned a black belt in karate in high school. He went to attend the University of California, Santa Barbara, where he earned a BFA in acting. Appelman then attended the Yale School of Drama for his MFA in acting.

Career
Appelman's first job out of graduate school was playing Tybalt in Romeo and Juliet. He would then go on act in regional theatre in such productions as Hamlet, Timon of Athens, King Lear and A Midsummer Night's Dream. Appelman then went on to the New York City theatre district to perform in Theatre for a New Audience's A Midsummer Night's Dream as Demetrius and Broadway's War Horse as Sgt. Fine.

Appelman went on to perform in film and on television. He appeared in 2013's Kill Your Darlings as Luke Detweiler. His first lead role was in 2014's A Midsummer Night's Dream as Demetrius. In season 15 of Law & Order: Special Victims Unit, Appelman guest starred as Officer Jimmy Hamilton in two episodes. He guest starred as Joe Corbin during the second season of the Sleepy Hollow television series. He had a recurring role during season three of Beauty & the Beast as Alton Finn. On August 21, 2015, it was announced that Appelman had been made a series regular on Sleepy Hollow. Appelman was featured in Sheri Wilner's play The Miracle of Chanukah and Patrick Gabridge's play Christmas Breaks for public radio show and podcast. In 2016, Appelman appeared in the film Complete Unknown. In 2017, he portrayed Assistant US Attornery Matt Miller on Chicago P.D.

Filmography

Film

Television

Theatre

References

External links

 
 

1985 births
American male film actors
American male television actors
American male stage actors
Living people
Male actors from Palo Alto, California
Yale School of Drama alumni